Metoq (Metochi) is a village in Vlorë County, southwestern Albania. It is part of the municipality Sarandë. It is located to the east of Sarandë, next to the village of Vrion. The village is primarily inhabited by ethnic Greeks.

Ruins of two ancient Greek temples were found in the vicinity of the village. 
The village stands by the roads that connect Sarandë with the Albanian Riviera, as well as with the national road to Gjirokastër.

References

Villages in Vlorë County
Populated places in Sarandë
Greek communities in Albania
Villages in Albania